Adam Walker (born 14 July 1986 in Kirkcaldy, Fife) is a Scottish professional ice hockey player. He is currently the player-head coach of the Paisley Pirates of the Scottish National League. He previously in the British Elite Ice Hockey League for the Cardiff Devils, Manchester Phoenix and the Braehead Clan.

Career
In 2001, Walker began his career icing for the Fife Flyers, his local team, playing at BNL level.  Initially, Walker played few games, only managing 11 games in his first two seasons. During the 2003/04 season however, Walker became much more of a regular player, icing on 31 occasions, and gaining his first professional points.

The following season, Walker remained in the BNL but moved to play for the Guildford Flames, as well as making several appearances for their U-19 team, the Guildford Phoenix. Again Walker was a regular player, turning out another 31 times. Walker was again on the move the following summer, and after the collapse of the BNL signed for the Swindon Wildcats in the EPL. This proved to be Walker's breakout season, in which he managed a total of 63 points in 41 games.

This return of points led to him signing for the Cardiff Devils, a team playing in the top tier of British Ice Hockey, the EIHL. Opportunities proved to be limited though, and so in the summer of 2006, Walker moved north to link up with fellow Scot Tony Hand, now the player/coach of the Manchester Phoenix.

In his first season as a Phoenix player, Walker gave a return of 23 points in 58 games, a statistic which included a hat-trick against the Basingstoke Bison.  Walker made the decision to stay with the Phoenix the following season, and featured in every game throughout 2007/08, managing to score 10 points along the way. Walker's consistency and work rate again convinced head coach Hand to re-sign him for the 2008/09 campaign where he picked up 29 points in 69 games.  Walker stayed with the Phoenix for a fourth season, despite the club's decision to move to the EPIHL. During the 2009/2010 season, Walker produced a career high of 102 points in 54 games.

It was announced that Walker would return to the Elite League, joining newcomers Braehead Clan for the 2010/2011 season. He re-signed for a second season with the Clan on 21 April 2011 where he produced his best points tally in the Elite League with 26 points. Walker further extended his contract for a third season on 9 February 2012.

On 30 October 2013 Walker signed for the EPIHL's Telford Tigers. On 3 June 2014 he returned to the Manchester Phoenix.

Walker retired after the 2014–15 season and became head coach of the Dundee Comets of the Scottish National League in 2016. In 2017, he was named head coach of the Paisley Pirates and came out of retirement to register himself as a player-head coach. He scored 22 goals in 13 games with a total of 37 points in his first season after his two-year retirement.

Personal life
His younger brother Ben Walker is also a professional ice hockey player and is currently playing alongside him at the Paisley Pirates.

References

External links

Adam Walker Personal Profile, Manchester Phoenix Official Website
'Walker Back For Third Season With Phoenix', Manchester Phoenix Official Website, 03/06/08
, Adam Walker Braehead Clan Profile

1986 births
Braehead Clan players
Cardiff Devils players
Fife Flyers players
Guildford Flames players
Living people
Manchester Phoenix players
Paisley Pirates players
Scottish ice hockey right wingers
Sportspeople from Kirkcaldy
Swindon Wildcats players
Telford Tigers players